Autolysis may refer to:

 Autolysis (biology), the destruction (or lysis) of a cell by its own enzymes
 Autocatalysis, in chemistry, the production of a substance which catalyzes a chemical reaction it was made in, or catalyzes its own transformation into another compound
 Autolysis (alcohol fermentation), the complex chemical reactions that take place when wine or beer spends time in contact with the (dead) yeast after fermentation
 Breadmaking#Preparation, the rest period in which dough is left without yeast or starter to autolyse for improved gluten development
 Autolysing yeast, the natural process by which yeast breaks down its own proteins to simpler compounds, in the production of commercial extract